Francis Scott, 2nd Duke of Buccleuch, KT, FRS (11 January 1695 – 22 April 1751) was a Scottish nobleman.

Family background
Buccleuch was the son of Sir James Scott, Earl of Dalkeith (son of James Scott, 1st Duke of Monmouth and Anne Scott, 1st Duchess of Buccleuch) and Lady Henrietta Hyde, daughter of Laurence Hyde, 1st Earl of Rochester. Through his father, Charles II of England was his great-grandfather. Scott was baptised on 20 January 1695 in St. James's Church, Westminster.

Following the death of his father in 1705, he was styled the Earl of Dalkeith, until he succeeded to the dukedom of Buccleuch, 6February 1732, on the death of his grandmother, who was Duchess of Buccleuch in her own right. At the same time, other titles in the Scottish peerage came his way: Earl of Dalkeith and Baron Scott of Whitchester and Eskdale.

His grandfather, the Duke of Monmouth, was the illegitimate son of Charles II who raised a rebellion upon James II and VII's accession to the English, Scottish and Irish thrones, and was beheaded for it. Monmouth's noble titles were consequently forfeit, but in March 1743 two of those titles were restored to his progeny when the House of Lords passed a bill making Buccleuch the 2nd Earl of Doncaster, as well as 2nd Baron Scott of Tindall, both in the English peerage (conferred 22 March 1743).

Career 

In his youth, he attended Eton College. Throughout his adult life, Buccleuch associated himself with institutions that promoted learning. He was a Freemason, a member of the Grand Lodge at a period when scientific interests figured prominently in its pursuits. From 24 June 1723 to 24 June 1724 he held the office of Grand Master of Freemasons. He was invested as a Fellow of the Royal Society (FRS) on 12 March 1724. He was closely associated with the Spalding Gentlemen's Society, a learned society of antiquaries, and he was the first to hold its office of Patron, inaugurated in 1734. On 18 April 1745 he was awarded the honorary degree of Doctor of Civil Law by the University of Oxford.

His interest at the court of George I was sufficient for him to be invested as a Knight of the Thistle on 2February 1725. In 1734 he entered the House of Lords when he was elected a Scottish representative peer. In 1740 and 1741, however, he signed protests produced by the opposition, including the November 1741 protest calling for the removal of Sir Robert Walpole from office. It is no surprise that Buccleuch in turn lost the support of the administration at the Scottish peers' election of 1741 and consequently failed to be re-elected. He would, nonetheless, return to the House of Lords when he became Earl of Doncaster in 1743.

Personal life 

Buccleuch married, firstly, Lady Jane Douglas, daughter of James Douglas, 2nd Duke of Queensberry, and Mary Boyle, on 5April 1720 in Earl of Rochester's House, Privy Gardens, Whitehall. They had two sons (Francis and Charles) and three daughters. Lady Jane died in 1729 and is buried at Dalkeith Castle. He married, secondly, Alice Powell, daughter of Joseph Powell, on 4September 1744 in St. George's Chapel, Mayfair, London, England. Both his sons predeceased him, so he was succeeded by his grandson Henry Scott, 3rd Duke of Buccleuch, the son of Francis. According to his will, he had six other children by Sarah Atkinson. He also appears to have had a son and three daughters by Elizabeth Jenkins.

He possessed several estates, some in Scotland and others in England. These included, in Scotland, Dalkeith Palace and Bowhill House (which he bought for his son Charles in 1747), and in England, Spalding in Lincolnshire, Langley in Berkshire and Hall Place at Hurley.

Buccleuch was buried on 26 April 1751 in Eton College Chapel. Lady Louisa Stuart called him "a man of mean understanding and meaner habits", and added that after his first wife's death "he plunged into such low amours, and lived so entirely with the lowest company, that his person was scarcely known to his equals, and his character fell into utter contempt". Though a distant kinswoman by marriage and therefore privy to family remembrances of Buccleuch, Stuart's judgment must be treated with caution; she had no first-hand knowledge of the man, having not yet been born at the time of his death.

Ancestry

References

|-

1694 births
1751 deaths
Francis
202
Knights of the Thistle
Fellows of the Royal Society
Scottish representative peers
F
People from Hurley, Berkshire
18th-century Scottish landowners
Freemasons of the Premier Grand Lodge of England
Grand Masters of the Premier Grand Lodge of England